Plantation House is the official residence of the governor of Saint Helena.

History
The house was built 1791-2 by the East India Company, as a "country" or summer residence for the governor. The company governed the island until 1834, when it became a crown colony, although governors of the island have continued to use the property since. Administration of the island is generally carried out from Jamestown, notably at The Castle (historically the governor's residence which then became the "town" residence). An explanation for the location of the governor's official residence is the less arid climate and terrain found further inland, compared to in James Valley. The (summer) residence of the lieutenant governor was Longwood House, also inland from Jamestown.

The house was extended most dramatically in 1816 and considerable alterations, mostly external, were made in 1960. The roof was originally slate but, like with most buildings on the island, this has been replaced with metal sheeting. It is designated as a Grade I listed building. Tours of the state rooms are available by appointment.

Tortoises
Possibly the world's oldest living tortoise, named Jonathan, resides in the grounds and belongs to the government of Saint Helena. He potentially could also be the last living example of his species. The grounds are home to at least five giant tortoises and are open to visitors at any time.

Neighbourhood
The house is situated in the district of St Paul's and nearby is St Paul's Cathedral, also a Grade I listed building.

References

External links

Saint Helena Island Info, Plantation House
Saint Helena government The Tortoises at Plantation House
Flickr Plantation House in 2010
Plantation House with the old Country Church behind, c. 1812

Grade I listed buildings in Saint Helena
Politics of Saint Helena
Government Houses of the British Empire and Commonwealth
Official residences
Properties of the East India Company
Houses completed in 1792
Government buildings completed in 1792